William Frederick Jones (15 November 1912 – 30 March 1987) was an Australian rules footballer who played with Carlton and North Melbourne in the Victorian Football League (VFL).

Notes

External links 

Bill Jones's profile at Blueseum

1912 births
1987 deaths
Carlton Football Club players
North Melbourne Football Club players
Australian rules footballers from Victoria (Australia)
Port Melbourne Football Club players